Vajira Srimathi Dissanayake (1943 – 29 March 2019) was a Sri Lankan lawyer, politician and 1994 UNP presidential candidate.

Early life and family
Dissanayake was born in 1943. She was the daughter of Piyasena Lenaduwa from Galle in southern Ceylon. She was educated at  Ladies' College, Colombo.

After school Dissanayake joined Ceylon Law College where she met her future husband Gamini Dissanayake. They had two sons, Navin and Mayantha, both of whom are Members of Parliament, and a daughter, Varuni.

Career
Dissanayake was a lawyer by profession and was a member of the Central Provincial Council. Her husband Gamini Dissanayake, who was the Leader of the Opposition, was chosen by the United National Party to be its candidate at the 1994 presidential election. However, he was killed in a suicide bombing on 24 October 1994, sixteen days before the election. The UNP, hoping to capitalise on the sympathy vote, chose Srima Dissanayake over former Prime Minister Ranil Wickremesinghe and former first lady Hema Premadasa to be Gamini Dissanayake’s replacement. However, many UNP officials refused to campaign for Srima Dissanayake who, for security reasons, campaigned through the media only. Dissanayake was heavily defeated by Prime Minister Chandrika Kumaratunga who swept the polls, winning in all but one of the 160 polling divisions. Dissanayake received 2,715,283 votes (35.91%), the lowest share for a major party candidate in any Sri Lankan presidential election.

Dissanayake left politics afterwards and devoted herself to her family, the Gamini Dissanayake Foundation and the Gamini Dissanayake Institute of Technology and Vocational Studies.

Dissanayake died at a private hospital in Colombo on 29 March 2019.

See also
List of political families in Sri Lanka

Notes

References

1943 births
2019 deaths
Alumni of Ladies' College, Colombo
Alumni of Ceylon Law College
Members of the Central Provincial Council
People from British Ceylon
Sinhalese lawyers
Sinhalese politicians
Sri Lankan Buddhists
Candidates in the 1994 Sri Lankan presidential election
United National Party politicians